Andrey Chukhley (born 2 October 1987) is a Belarusian football midfielder who plays for Ostrovets.

Career
Chukhley left FC Tyumen in December 2014.

On 11 August 2016, Andrey Chukhley joined A Lyga club Kauno Žalgiris. He moved to another A Lyga team Jonava in 2016–17 winter transfer window, but decided to leave the club after 4 months.

On 19 March 2019, Chukhley left Ararat Yerevan by mutual consent.

References

External links
 
 
 

1987 births
Living people
Footballers from Minsk
Belarusian footballers
Association football midfielders
Belarusian expatriate footballers
Expatriate footballers in Russia
Expatriate footballers in Lithuania
Expatriate footballers in Armenia
Belarusian expatriate sportspeople in Lithuania
Russian Premier League players
A Lyga players
Belarus international footballers
FC Darida Minsk Raion players
FC Dinamo-Juni Minsk players
FC Dinamo Minsk players
FC Ural Yekaterinburg players
FC Tyumen players
FC Minsk players
FC Vitebsk players
FC Neman Grodno players
FK Kauno Žalgiris players
FK Jonava players
FC Smolevichi players
FC Dnepr Mogilev players
FC Ararat Yerevan players
FC Slavia Mozyr players
FC Ostrovets players